Sarra may refer to:

 Chris Sarra (21st century), Australian educator
 Janis Sarra, Canadian lawyer
 Sarra Manning (21st century), writer
 Sarra, Nablus, a town in the West Bank
 Ma'tan as-Sarra, an oasis in Libya

See also

 Sara (disambiguation)